Tórshavn Municipality (Tórshavnar kommuna) is the municipality of the Faroese capital Tórshavn and its surroundings.

The municipality covers the southern half of Streymoy island and adjacent minor islands and has an area of 173 km2. It became an independent municipality in 1866 and is the largest in the Faroes. The municipality has a population of about 23,061 (December 2022) or 40.5% of the total population of the islands.

It contains the following towns and villages:

Tórshavn
Argir
Hoyvík
Hvítanes
Kaldbak
Kaldbaksbotnur
Kirkjubøur
Velbastaður
Kollafjørður
Oyrareingir
Signabøur
Sund
Norðradalur
Syðradalur
Nólsoy
Hestur
Koltur

Population progression
Progression of the population of Tórshavn since 1801:

Politics

Municipal council
Tórshavn's municipal council consists of 13 members, elected every four years.

References

Sources

Heim | Hagstova Føroya

External links
 Official website

Municipalities of the Faroe Islands
Streymoy